Buddy & Soul is a 1969 live album by the Buddy Rich Big Band, recorded at the Whisky a Go Go club in West Hollywood, California.

Track listing 
LP side A
 "Soul Lady" (Don Sebesky) – 4:55
 "St. Peterburg Race" (Mike Mainieri) – 2:43
 "Soul Kitchen" (Jim Morrison, Robby Krieger, Ray Manzarek, John Densmore) – 3:57
 "Wonderbag" (Kim Richmond) – 4:51
 "Ruth" (Bill Holman) – 4:12
LP side B
 "Love and Peace" (Arthur Adams) – 3:38
 "Hello, I Love You"  (Morrison, Krieger, Manzarek, Densmore) – 4:17
 "Comin' Home Baby" (Bob Dorough, Ben Tucker) – 3:17
 "The Meaning of the Blues" (Bobby Troup, Leah Worth) – 3:44
 "Greensleeves" (Traditional) – 4:38
Bonus tracks on 2000 CD reissue
 "Mexicali Nose" (Harry Betts) – 3:36
 "Buddy Buddy" (Allyn Ferguson) – 3:48
 "Acid Truth" (Don Menza) – 5:08
 "Parthenia" (Shelly Manne) – 5:03
 "Street Kiddie" (Holman) – 3:40
 "The Word" (Don Piestrup) – 5:51
 "It's Crazy" (Holman) – 5:59

Personnel 
The Buddy Rich big band
 Buddy Rich - drums
 Richie Cole - alto saxophone
 Joe Romano - clarinet, flute, alto saxophone
 Ernie Watts – clarinet, flute, alto saxophone
 Pat La Barbera - clarinet, flute, tenor saxophone
 Don Menza - flute, soprano saxophone, tenor saxophone
 Joe Calo - baritone saxophone
 Dave Culp - trumpet
 Sal Marquez - trumpet
 Nat Pavone - trumpet
 Michael Price - trumpet
 Bob Yance - trumpet
 Vince Diaz - trombone
 Rick Stepton - trombone
 Don Switzer - trombone, bass trombone
 Herb Ellis - guitar
 David Lahm - organ, piano
 Bob Magnusson - double bass, bass guitar, fender jazz bass
 Larry Bunker - percussion
 Victor Feldman - percussion
 Arranged by: Dick Clements, Bill Holman, Mike Mainieri, Don Piestrup. Kim Richmond, Shorty Rogers, Joe Sample & Don Sebesky

Production
 Ron Wolin - art direction, design
 Lee Hershberg - engineer
 Lanky Linstrot
 Dean Pratt - producer, liner notes
 Bob Belden - producer, remixing
 Richard Bock - producer
 Patrick Roques - reissue design
 Joel Moss - remixing

References 

 World Pacific Jazz 20158
 Blue Note 23558 (2000 CD reissue)

Buddy Rich live albums
1969 live albums
Albums arranged by Shorty Rogers
Albums arranged by Don Sebesky
Albums recorded at the Whisky a Go Go
Pacific Jazz Records live albums